The 2008 Algarve Cup was the fifteenth edition of the Algarve Cup, an invitational women's football tournament held annually in Portugal. It took place between 5  and 12 March 2008 with the reigning champions the United States winning the event for a record sixth time, after defeating Denmark, 2–1, in the final game in a repeat of the previous year's final.

Format
The twelve invited teams were split into three groups that played a round-robin tournament. The entrants were almost identical to the previous year, but Italy moved up into Group B from their previous ranking in 2007, replacing France who did not feature this time. Poland appeared in the competition for the first time.

Groups A and B, containing the strongest ranked teams, were the only ones in contention to win the title. The group winners from A and B contested the final, with the runners-up playing for third place and those that finished third in these two groups playing for fifth place.

The teams in Group C were playing for places 7–12, with the winner of Group C playing the team that finished fourth in Group A or B with the better record for seventh place and the Group C runner-up playing the team which came last in Group A or B with the worse record for ninth place. The third and fourth-placed teams in Group C played for eleventh place.

Points awarded in the group stage follow the standard formula of three points for a win, one point for a draw and zero points for a loss. In the case of two teams being tied on the same number of points in a group, their head-to-head result determined the higher placed.

Teams
The twelve invited teams were:

Group stage
All times local (WET/UTC+0)

Group A

Group B

Group C

Placement play-offs
All times local (WET/UTC+0)

11th place

9th place

7th place

5th place

3rd place

Final

References

Algarve Cup, 2008
Algarve Cup
2008
March 2008 sports events in Europe
2008 in Portuguese women's sport